The 2022 National Amateur Cup was the 98th edition of the National Amateur Cup, a knockout cup competition open to amateur teams affiliated with the United States Adult Soccer Association (USASA). It was the fourth edition of the tournament to award its champion a spot in the U.S. Open Cup.

Lansdowne Yonkers FC were the defending National Amateur Cup champion, but failed to advance after falling to the NY Greek Americans in the Eastern New York Final. Bavarian United SC won their sixth National Amateur Cup title, defeating Northern Virginia FC 1–0 in the final.

Format 
All four regions of the USASA will hold tournaments to crown champions, which would then qualify for the final tournament. Qualification for these tournaments is determined individually by each region. The final four teams then compete in a single location knockout tournament to crown a national champion, with an additional game in place to determine both third and fourth place.

Prior to the regional tournament's beginning, the United Premier Soccer League was approved as a National Affiliate member of the United States Soccer Federation. Due to this, UPSL left its sanctioning under USASA and its teams became ineligible for the association's tournaments including the Amateur Cup.

Region I 
Nine state associations in USASA Region I sent representatives to the tournament for the Fritz Marth Amateur Cup. The Eastern Premier Soccer League is the most represented league in the region with three teams participating (Fall River, Greek Americans, and NoVa FC). The final of the regional tournament took place on June 19 at the Ukrainian American Sports Center in North Wales, Pennsylvania.

First round

Bracket

Home teams listed on top of bracket

Bold = winner
* = after extra time, = penalty shootout score

Region II 
In total, 22 teams across eight states signed up to compete in the tournament for the Bill Davey Amateur Cup. The Midwest Premier League is the most represented league in the region with seven teams participating, followed by the Ohio Valley Premier League with four teams. Illinois is the most represented state in the tournament with six teams taking part. The final of the regional tournament took place on June 25 at the SeatGeek Stadium Turf Fields in Bridgeview, Illinois.

Home teams listed on top of bracket

Bold = winner
* = after extra time, = penalty shootout score

Region III 
Region III held its tournament on June 10–12 at Carpenter Park in Plano, Texas. Only four state associations were represented at the competition with four teams coming from the state of Texas (two from Texas South and two from Texas North).

Unlike the other regions, Region III separated its entrants into two groups with each playing three games over two days. Teams played one game against each member of their group and one additional game against a team from the other group. The two highest finishing team from each group moved on to Sunday morning's semifinal round. The Region III Amateur Cup Final took place immediately after on Sunday afternoon.

Following the completion of the regional, champion Beaman United FC was disqualified for using professional players on their roster. Subsequently, their spot in the National Amateur Cup finals went to runner-up ASC New Stars.

Group A

Group B

Knockout stage

Region IV 
Only two states elected to send representatives to the Region IV tournament; Colorado and California. A majority of the teams (5) come from Colorado with three being members of the Colorado Super League and two from the Mountain Premier League. Those teams will compete in a single elimination tournament with the last remaining hosting the Cal South State Cup Champion for the Region IV Amateur Cup.

Home teams listed on top of bracket

Bold = winner
* = after extra time, = penalty shootout score

Region IV Final

National Amateur Cup Finals 
The national finals were held between August 6 and 7 at the Bavarian United Soccer Complex's Heartland Value Fund Stadium in Glendale, Wisconsin. Bavarian United SC won the championship for a sixth time by beating Northern Virginia FC, 1–0. As champion Bavarian received a spot in the 2023 U.S. Open Cup and $7,000.

Bold = winner
* = after extra time, = penalty shootout score

Notes

References 

National Amateur Cup
National Amateur Cup
2022